Mapholoso Faith Nketsi-Njilo is a South African influencer, model and media personality. She is well known for being a member of a dance group in her younger years. After she left the group she became a reality TV star and scored a reality show called Have Faith that airs on MTV and Netflix. She also works along side with multiple brands and has gained a large social media following.

Early life and career
Faith was born in Johannesburg. She started her career when she was sixteen years old. Faith gained media attention when she was part of a girl hip hop dance crew. She appeared in the music video of Cassper Nyovest's single, "Tito Mboweni."

On 30 July 2018, she launched 'Get Snatched', a diet and workout programme.

In November 2019, Nketsi starred in her own reality show called "#HaveFaith" which premiered on MTV Africa in South Africa, making her the first woman with her own reality show on the channel. Faith has over 1.3 million Instagram followers as of December 2019.

Faith launched her own music career in 2019, working with DJ Maphorisa. Her first EP, Disrespectful, has seven tracks and is produced by Blaqboy Music.

Personal life 
Faith is a social media influencer with 2.4 million followers on Instagram. She is one of South Africa's most popular influencers. She married wealthy businessman Nzuzo Njilo on 10 April 2022. Faith has since welcomed a beautiful baby girl and is taking her brand to new levels as a wife, mother and aspiring business mogul.

References

Living people
1994 births
South African Internet celebrities
South African television personalities
21st-century South African women singers
South African female models
Musicians from Johannesburg